Ernest Granier (15 May 1907 – 16 January 1993) was a French sailor. He competed in the 8 Metre event at the 1936 Summer Olympics.

References

External links
 

1907 births
1993 deaths
French male sailors (sport)
Olympic sailors of France
Sailors at the 1936 Summer Olympics – 8 Metre
Sportspeople from Sarthe
20th-century French people